The following is a list of notable deaths in July 1993.

Entries for each day are listed alphabetically by surname. A typical entry lists information in the following sequence:
 Name, age, country of citizenship at birth, subsequent country of citizenship (if applicable), reason for notability, cause of death (if known), and reference.

July 1993

1
Tom Berry, 81, English rugby player and administrator.
Gert Hofmann, 62, German writer and professor, cerebrovascular disease.
Sevi Holmsten, 71, Finnish rower and Olympian.
Eric Irvin, 84, Australian writer and historian of Australian theatre.

2
Weary Dunlop, 85, Australian surgeon and POW during World War II.
Fred Gwynne, 66, American actor (The Munsters, Car 54, Where Are You?, Pet Sematary), pancreatic cancer.
Irving J. Moore, 74, American television director, heart attack.
Mariette Protin, 87, French freestyle swimmer and Olympian.
Clarence Zener, 87, American physicist.
 Notable people killed during the Sivas massacre
Muhlis Akarsu, 45, Turkish folk singer and musician
Behçet Aysan, 44, Turkish poet
Asım Bezirci, 66, Turkish critic, writer and poet
Nesimi Çimen, 67, Turkish folk singer and poet
Hasret Gültekin, 22, Turkish musician and poet

3
Joe DeRita, 83, American actor and comedian (The Three Stooges), pneumonia.
Don Drysdale, 56, American baseball player and television sports commentator, heart attack.
Jorge Carpio Nicolle, 60, Guatemalan politician and newspaper publisher, murdered.
Dave Rubinstein, 28, American singer and co-founder of hardcore punk band Reagan Youth, suicide.
Novica Čanović, 31, Yugoslav and Serbian high jumper and Olympian, killed in action.

4
Bona Arsenault, 89, Canadian politician.
Lola Gaos, 71, Spanish actress, colorectal cancer.
Alston Scott Householder, 89, American mathematician.
Roman Abelevich Kachanov, 72, Soviet and Russian animator.
Hellmut Lantschner, 83, Austrian-German alpine skier and world champion.
Anne Shirley, 75, American actress, lung cancer.

5
Kali Banerjee, 71, Indian actor.
Charlie Bishop, 69, American baseball player.
Maria Teresa de Noronha, 74, Portuguese aristocrat and fado singer.
Tom Maguire, 101, Irish republican and politician.
Harrison Salisbury, 84, American journalist.

6
Olive Ann Beech, 88, American businesswoman and co-founder of the Beech Aircraft Corporation
John Gatenby Bolton, 71, British-Australian astronomer.
Jean-Baptiste Delille, 80, French racing cyclist.
Ruth Roche, Baroness Fermoy, 84, British Lady-in-waiting and confidante of Queen Elizabeth the Queen Mother.
Szabolcs Izsák, 49, Hungarian sailor and Olympian.
Michael Rothenstein, 85, English printmaker, painter and art teacher.

7
Elemér Berkessy, 88, Hungarian football player and coach.
Aleks Buda, 82, Albanian historian.
Ben Chapman, 84, American Major League Baseball player, heart attack.
Ove Arbo Høeg, 94, Norwegian botanist.
Rıfat Ilgaz, 82, Turkish teacher, writer and poet.
William McElwee Miller, 100, American missionary and author.
Mia Zapata, 27, American singer (The Gits), murdered.

8
Charles Adkins, 61, American boxer and Olympic champion.
Isabela Corona, 80, Mexican actress, heart attack.
Wayne Howell, 72, American voice-over announcer, heart attack.
John Riseley-Prichard, 69, British racing driver, AIDS related disease.
Paul Sharits, 50, American filmmaker and visual artist.
Fred Weick, 93, American aviation pioneer and aircraft designer.

9
Metin Altıok, 52, Turkish poet, arson attack.
Henry Hazlitt, 98, American journalist and writer.
Jaap Meijer, 80, Dutch historian and poet.
Steve Previn, 67, German-American television director and film producer.
Will Rogers, Jr., 81, American politician, writer, and newspaper publisher, suicide.

10
Teodor Anioła, 67, Polish  football player.
Alfred Haemerlinck, 87, Belgian road bicycle racer.
Muhammad Ali Haitham, 53, Prime Minister of South Yemen.
Masuji Ibuse, 95, Japanese author.
Ruth Krauss, 91, American children's author.
Ivan Maček, 84, Yugoslav-Slovenian communist politician.
Sam Rolfe, 69, American screenwriter and television producer (The Man from U.N.C.L.E.), heart attack.
Armand Vaquerin, 42, French rugby player.

11
Mario Bauzá Cárdenas, 82, Cuban latin and jazz musician.
Bill Falkinder, 71, Australian air force officer and politician.
Mary Moder, 87, American voice actress for Disney, heart attack.
Saint Sophrony, 96, Russian monk and Archimandrite.
Denis Tomlinson, 82, Rhodesian cricket player.

12
Ferdinando Giuseppe Antonelli, 96, Italian Roman Catholic cardinal.
Lily Bouwmeester, 91, Dutch theater and film actress.
Li Da, 88, Chinese communist general.
Dan Eldon, 22, British-Kenyan photojournalist, artist and activist, stoned.
Michał Goleniewski, 70, Polish intelligence officer and spy.
Saiyid Nurul Hasan, 71, Indian historian and politician, kidney failure.
Gusti Huber, 78, Austrian-American actress.
John Jenkins, 62, American jazz saxophonist.
James Peck, 78, American activist and pacifist.
Antun Šoljan, 60, Croatian writer.

13
Davey Allison, 32, American NASCAR racing driver, helicopter crash.
Jürgen Frohriep, 65, German actor.
A. K. Ramanujan, 64, Indian poet and scholar.
Leslie Thorne, 77, Scottish racing driver.

14
Henning A. Blomen, 82, American politician.
Léo Ferré, 76, French-Monégasque poet and composer.
Hannes Kästner, 63, German organist and harpsichordist.
Gary Mull, 55, American yacht designer.

15
Hugo Ballivián, 92, President of Bolivia.
David Brian, 78, American actor, cancer.
Young Corbett III, 88, Italian-American boxing champion.
Yevgeny Fyodorov, 81, Soviet Air Force major general and Hero of the Soviet Union.
Bert Greeves, 87, British motorcycle pioneer.

16
Gretel Adorno, 91, German chemist and intellectual.
Jack Brewer, 79, British athlete and Olympian.
Joseph Culverwell, 75, Zimbabwean politician.
Michel Hollard, 95, French member of the resistance during World War II.
Genowefa Kobielska, 87, Polish track and field athlete and Olympian.
José Pastenes, 78, Chilean football player.

17
Vladimir Barmin, 84, Russian engineer and rocket scientist.
Pál Dunay, 84, Hungarian epee and foil fencer and Olympian.
Eschel Rhoodie, 60, South African politician and spin doctor.
Hamo Sahyan, 79, Armenian poet and translator.
Adolf Yushkevich, 87, Soviet historian of mathematics.

18
Toru Abe, 76, Japanese film actor.
Héctor Freschi, 82, Argentinian football goalkeeper.
Jean Negulesco, 93, Romanian-American film director and screenwriter.
Davis Roberts, 76, American actor, pulmonary emphysema.
Michael Winstanley, Baron Winstanley, 74, British politician.

19
Szymon Goldberg, 84, Polish-American classical violinist and conductor.
Gordon Gray, 82, Scottish Roman Catholic cardinal.
Shozo Ishihara, 82, Japanese speed skater and Olympian.
Girilal Jain, 69, Indian journalist.
Elmar Klos, 83, Czech film director.
Fred Liewehr, 84, Austrian stage and film actor.
Red Prysock, 67, American rhythm and blues tenor saxophonist.
Luzius Rüedi, 93, Swiss ice hockey player.

20
Vince Foster, 48, American attorney and deputy White House counsel, suicide.
Afanasy Kovalyov, 89, Soviet statesman and politician.
Jacqueline Lamba, 82, French painter and surrealist artist.
Tsunemi Tsuda, 32, Japanese baseball player, brain cancer.

21
Robert Glass, 53, American sound engineer (E.T. the Extra Terrestrial, Close Encounters of the Third Kind, Flashdance), Oscar winner (1983).
René-Jean Jacquet, 60, French football goalkeeper.
Edwin James George Pitman, 95, Australian mathematician.
Richard Tee, 49, American musician, prostate cancer.
Michael Wulf, 30, German heavy metal musician, motorcycle accident.

22
John Crichton-Stuart, 6th Marquess of Bute, 60, Scottish peer and art collector, cancer.
Gunnar Bror Fritiof Degelius, 90, Swedish lichenologist.
Piero Heliczer, 56, Italian-American poet, publisher, actor and filmmaker, traffic collision.
Roscoe Robinson, Jr., 64, American Army general.

23
Saad bin Abdulaziz, 77, Saudi royal.
Florence Nightingale David, 83, English statistician.
Raul Gardini, 60, Italian businessman, suicide.
John Langford-Holt, 77, British politician.
Rudolf Macúch, 73, Slovak-German linguist.
Luís de Sttau Monteiro, 67, Portuguese writer, novelist and playwright.
Abe Shires, 76, American gridiron football player.
Otis "Big Smokey" Smothers, 64, American Chicago blues guitarist and singer.
Megan Taylor, 72, British figure skater and Olympian.
Lera Millard Thomas, 92, American politician.

24
Erik Jansson, 86, Swedish road racing cyclist.
Joe Osmanski, 75, American gridiron football player.
Víktor Pankrashkin, 35, Soviet basketball player.
Rene Requiestas, 36, Filipino actor and comedian, tuberculosis.

25
Margaret Campbell, Duchess of Argyll, 80, Scottish noblewoman.
Francis Bouygues, 70, French businessman and film producer.
Ganku, 69, Chinese politician.
Nan Grey, 75, American film actress, heart attack.
Steven Pankow, 85, American businessman and politician.
Cecilia Parker, 79, Canadian-American film actress.
Vincent Schaefer, 87, American chemist and meteorologist.
Conrad L. Wirth, 93, American landscape architect and conservationist.

26
Daniel Fuchs, 84, American screenwriter, fiction writer, and essayist, heart failure.
Marcellite Garner, 83, American artist and voice actress (Minnie Mouse).
Jesús Castro González, 42, Spanish football player, drowned.
Simon Greenberg, 92, Russian-American rabbi and scholar.
Mikhail Kozell, 81, Soviet and Russian painter.
Yuri Levitin, 80, Soviet and Russian composer of classical music.
Matthew Ridgway, 98, American Army officer, cardiovascular disease.

27
Lauren Ackerman, 88, American physician and pathologist.
John Brooks, 73, American writer, stroke.
Kashiko Kawakita, 85, Japanese film producer and film curator.
Reggie Lewis, 27, American basketball player, heart attack.
T. Dan Smith, 78, British politician.

28
Jack Browne, Baron Craigton, 88, Scottish politician.
Jacques Laudy, 86, Belgian comics artist.
Cemal Madanoğlu, 86, Turkish general and politician.
Stanley Woods, 90, Irish motorcycle racer.

29
Fidencio Castillo, 85, Mexican artist and educator.
Nicolai Costenco, 79, Moldovan writer.
Joyce Haber, 62, American gossip columnist, kidney and liver failure.
Jack Kitching, 72, English rugby player and coach.
Caroline K. Simon, 92, American lawyer, judge and politician.

30
Frank L. Howley, 90, American Army brigadier general.
Edward E. Jones, 65, American psychologist and scholar.
Condor Laucke, 78, Australian politician, pulmonary emphysema.
Don Myrick, 53, American saxophonist, shot.
Edward Bernard Raczyński, 101, Polish diplomat, writer, and politician.
Jay Scott, 43, Canadian film critic, AIDS-related complications.

31
Lenore Aubert, 75, Slovenian-American model and actress.
Baudouin I of Belgium, 62, King of the Belgians, heart attack.
Paul B. Henry, 51, American politician and professor of political science, brain cancer.
Gabdrakhman Kadyrov, 52, Soviet speedway rider.
George Keyt, 92, Sri Lankan painter.
Richard M. Leonard, 84, American rock climber, environmentalist and attorney.
Fang Zhichun, 87, Chinese politician.

References 

1993-07
 07